Ground force may refer to:
 Ground Force, a British garden makeover television series
 Ground forces, a designation some countries give to their armies
 Ground reaction force (GRF), the force exerted by the ground on a body in contact with it